Robert Payton Reid A.R.S.A. (1859 – 1945) was a Scottish academic painter.

References

1859 births
1945 deaths
20th-century Scottish painters
Scottish male painters
20th-century Scottish male artists